"Diggi-Loo Diggi-Ley" was the winning song in the Eurovision Song Contest 1984 performed in Swedish by the trio of brothers Herrey's, representing . Lyrics were written by Britt Lindeborg, and the tune by Torgny Söderberg. It was produced by Anders Engberg and Torgny Söderberg.

The song is an upbeat 1980s-style dance song, performed by three clean-cut young men – fellow Swedish Eurovision participant Tommy Körberg famously dubbed them "the dancing deodorants" in the press, a derogatory nickname that stuck with them for the rest of their career in their home country – and the nonsensical title harking back to previous entries such as "Boom Bang-a-Bang", "Ding-a-dong" and "La, la, la". The song has achieved considerable fame among Eurovision Song Contest fans, with a well-known archive of contest lyrics using the domain name diggiloo.net, named after it. Despite the reception the song receives today, in the run-up to the contest it was not an immediate favorite to win: bookmakers Ladbrokes had 's  "Terminal 3" and 's "I treni di Tozeur" as higher favourites, so the song winning came as a surprise to many.

No song sung first or second has won since.

The song itself deals with the lead singer discovering a pair of golden shoes in the street one day. He puts them on and immediately feels like dancing in the street, entering a "magical world". Thus, he wishes for everyone to have a pair. The English translation, which the group sang in their winning reprise at the Contest, took much the same theme.

Richard Herrey, lead singer of the band, performed at the Congratulations special in late 2005. In 2015, all three band members performed the track with a mixture of English and Swedish lyrics at Apollo theatre in Hammersmith, London as part of the BBC's Eurovision Song Contest's Greatest Hits concert to mark the contests 60th anniversary.

The highest chart position the song reached was No. 2, in the Swedish singles chart. They reached No. 46 on the UK Singles Chart.

Track listing 
"Diggi Loo – Diggi Ley" – 3:05
"Every Song You Sing" – 3:34

Charts

Covers 

The Swedish heavy metal band Black Ingvars covered "Diggi-Loo Diggi-Ley" on their 1998 album Schlager Metal.
Meiju Suvas has recorded a version in Finnish.
The Danish duo Small Talk released an English cover version on their 2001 album Eurovision.

References

External links 
"Diggi-loo diggi-ley" at the Austrian singles chart
"Diggi-loo diggi-ley" at the Norwegian singles chart
"Diggi-loo diggi-ley" at the Swedish singles chart
"Diggi-loo diggi-ley" at the Swiss singles chart

Eurovision songs of 1984
Melodifestivalen songs of 1984
Eurovision songs of Sweden
Eurovision Song Contest winning songs
Swedish-language songs
Songs written by Torgny Söderberg
Herreys songs
Mariann Grammofon singles
1984 songs
1984 singles